Oxyanthus montanus is a species of plant in the family Rubiaceae. It is found in Cameroon and Equatorial Guinea. Its natural habitats are subtropical or tropical moist lowland forests and subtropical or tropical moist montane forests. It is threatened by habitat loss.

References

montanus
Vulnerable plants
Taxonomy articles created by Polbot